Mera Karam Mera Dharam  (transl. My deed, my religion) is a 1987 Bollywood film, starring Dharmendra and Moushumi Chatterjee.

Plot
Ajay lives in poverty with his mother until his rich maternal uncle Devi Prasad bequeaths him a small fortune, but little does Ajay know that the fortune comes with consequences.

Cast 

Dharmendra as Ajay Shankar Sharma
Moushumi Chatterjee as Mala
Yogeeta Bali as Neela
Shyama as Neela's Mother
Raj Mehra as Doctor
Shashikala as Mala's Aunty
Johnny Walker as Second Master
Asit Sen as Head Master
Brahmachari as Anand
Uttam Kumar as Devi Parsad
Urmila Bhatt as Shivani Sharma
Shreeram Lagoo as Sarju Prasad
 Abhi Bhattacharya as Pujari
Rajan Haksar as Ram Bhajan
Padma Khanna as Dancer
Prakash Gill as Bajrang 
Sajjan as Shambhu Dada
Jagdish Raj as Police Inspector

Soundtrack 
Lyrics: Anand Bakshi

References

External links 
 

1987 films
1980s Hindi-language films
Films scored by Laxmikant–Pyarelal